Blue Quills First Nation  is an Indian reserve shared by the Beaver Lake Cree, Cold Lake, Frog Lake, Heart Lake, Kehewin Cree, and Saddle Lake Cree First Nations in Alberta, located within the County of St. Paul No. 19. It is 3 kilometers west of St. Paul.

It is the site of Canada's only Indigenous-owned post-secondary institution, University nuhelotʼįne thaiyotsʼį nistameyimâkanak Blue Quills.

References

Indian reserves in Alberta
Cree reserves and territories